The 1900 North Dakota Agricultural Aggies football team was an American football team that represented North Dakota Agricultural College (now known as North Dakota State University) as an independent during the 1900 college football season. They played in 10 games and had a 8–1–1 record. It was their first season under new head coach Jack Harrison.

Schedule

References

North Dakota Agricultural
North Dakota State Bison football seasons
North Dakota Agricultural Aggies football